The women's 4x400 metres relay event  at the 1999 IAAF World Indoor Championships was held on March 7.

Results

References
Results

Relay
4 × 400 metres relay at the World Athletics Indoor Championships
1999 in women's athletics